Rapid Trident is an annual training exercise between Ukrainian, United States, and other military forces.

See also 
 Aerorozvidka

References 

Military exercises and wargames